Gonioscia is a genus of moths of the family Erebidae. The genus was erected by George Hampson in 1926.

Species
Gonioscia meroleuca Hampson, 1926 Gabon
Gonioscia piperita (Holland, 1894) Gabon, Cameroon

References

Calpinae